Charles de Lasteyrie (1877-1936) was a French banker and politician. He served as a member of the Chamber of Deputies from 1919 to 1924, representing Corrèze, and from 1928 to 1936, representing the Seine department. He served as the French Minister of Finance from 15 January 1922, to 26 March 1924. He died on 28 June 1936.

References

1877 births
1936 deaths
Politicians from Paris
Charles
Republican Federation politicians
French Ministers of Finance
Members of the 12th Chamber of Deputies of the French Third Republic
Members of the 14th Chamber of Deputies of the French Third Republic
Members of the 15th Chamber of Deputies of the French Third Republic
Members of the 16th Chamber of Deputies of the French Third Republic
French bankers
École Nationale des Chartes alumni